The Most Reverend Patrick Christopher Pinder, STD, CMG, KCHS, (born November 1, 1953) is a Roman Catholic archbishop. He was installed as Archbishop of Nassau in the Bahamas on May 4, 2004.

Biography
Pinder was born in Nassau and was baptized at St. Francis Xavier Cathedral and grew up in Nassau. After graduating high school in 1971, he entered Saint Meinrad Seminary and School of Theology in the United States where he completed a degree in Philosophy in 1975. He later obtained his S.T.B./M.A degree in theology from Catholic University of Louvain in Belgium in 1978.

He was ordained a Transitional Deacon on July 20, 1978 and ordained to the priesthood on August 15, 1980. He held various posts within the Archdiocese of Nassau including Moderator of the Curia, Vicar for Pastoral Affairs and Rector of St. Francis Xavier Cathedral.

Pinder received his Episcopal Ordination on June 27, 2003 and became Auxiliary Bishop of Nassau, a post he held for just 11 months before being installed as Archbishop on May 4, 2004.

References

External links

Roman Catholic Archdiocese of Nassau - Archbishop Patrick Pinder
Catholic Hierarchy - Archbishop Patrick Christopher Pinder, Archbishop of Nassau, Bahamas

1953 births
Living people
21st-century Roman Catholic archbishops in the Caribbean
Bahamian Roman Catholic archbishops
People from Nassau, Bahamas
Roman Catholic bishops in the Bahamas
Roman Catholic archbishops of Nassau